Pitati may refer to:

 Pítati, a contingent of archers in the Egyptian Empire
Bonifazio de' Pitati, better known as Bonifazio Veronese (1487–1553), Italian painter
Pietro Pitati (died c. 1550), Italian astronomer and mathematician